Bernd-Christian Funk (born September 14, 1943 in Trofaiach) is an Austrian legal scholar and educator.
Funk is a former professor of Constitutional and Administrative Law at the University of Vienna, the dean and academic director of the Sigmund Freud University Vienna Faculty of Law, and one of the governors of the Medical University of Innsbruck.

Early life 

Bernd-Christian Funk was born September 14, 1943 in Trofaiach.

Academic career 

Funk studied business and economics education at the Vienna University of Economics and Business, graduating with a master's degree in social and economic sciences.
He also read law at the University of Vienna, receiving his doctorate of law in 1968.
After graduating, Funk secured employment as an assistant professor with the Department of Constitutional and Administrative Law; he excelled to the point that he could submit his habilitation thesis after only six years, in 1974. He spent the next four years as a staff researcher with the Austrian Economic Chamber.

In 1978, he was appointed full professor for public law at the University of Graz. By 1987, he was the dean of the faculty, a position he would hold until 1991.

In August 1999, Funk was appointed head of the Department of University Law at the Johannes Kepler University Linz. In October of the same year, he also accepted a chair at the Department of Constitutional and Administrative Law with the University of Vienna.

In 2003, Funk took on lecturing positions with the Theresian Military Academy and the Jagiellonian University in addition to his continuing commitments at the Universities of Linz and Vienna. He also joined the academic commission of the Austrian Ministry of Defense and contributed to the Austria Convention, an inquiry into constitutional reform initiated by the first Schüssel government.
The same year, Funk was honored with a Festschrift on the occasion of his 60th birthday.

In 2011, Funk retired from his professorship in Vienna, his ministry position, and the Theresian Academy.
Two years later, he retired from his remaining two teaching positions but joined the ethics commission of the University for Continuing Education Krems and became one of the governors of the Medical University of Innsbruck.

In 2016, Funk became the founding dean and academic director of the Sigmund Freud University Vienna Faculty of Law.

Funk is the author of numerous books, textbooks, papers, and monographs. His contributions to Austrian legal scholarship are considered substantial. His significance in the area of Austrian administrative law has been compared to that of Ludwig Adamovich.

Political appointments 

In early 2003, the cabinet of then-Chancellor Wolfgang Schüssel launched the Austria Convention, a conference of legal scholars and public intellectuals tasked with drafting a new constitution for Austria. The existing constitution, exceptionally bulky and difficult to navigate, had been posing serious technical challenges to legislators and constitutional justices for decades. The convention was charged with exploring reform. Funk spent two years serving the convention as the chairman of the committee for fundamental rights.

From 1999 to 2007, Funk was the deputy chairman of the Austrian Human Rights Council, a government-sponsored watchdog committee.

Media 

Funk has gained name recognition beyond the legal community through his frequent commentary in the national news media. He is tapped for interviews by news outlets ranging from broadsheets to tabloids and from the national public broadcaster to entertainment and lifestyle magazines.
Funk has been asked to provide analysis on
Internet surveillance,
the appointment of Gerhart Holzinger to the Austrian Constitutional Court,
the legality of civilian video recording of police officers,
the interrelation between economic insecurity and police violence,
the Constitutional Court's annulment of the 2016 Austrian presidential election,
social security reform,
and
smoking bans,
among many other topics.

Honors 

 2003: Festschrift
 2009: Grand Decoration of Honour in Silver for Services to the Republic of Austria

Publications

Standard textbooks 

The first volume was first published in 1997, the last volume in 2009; all four volumes have been revised and reprinted at least once:

Selected other books

References

External links 

 Bernd-Christian Funk CV on the website of the Austrian Parliament
 Bernd-Christian Funk faculty page on the website of the Sigmund Freud University Vienna

1943 births
Living people
Austrian legal scholars
Recipients of the Decoration for Services to the Republic of Austria
University of Vienna alumni
Academic staff of the University of Vienna
Academic staff of the University of Graz
Academic staff of Johannes Kepler University Linz
Vienna University of Economics and Business alumni